Finn Dicke (born 14 September 2004) is a Dutch professional footballer who plays a centre-back for Portuguese club Estoril.

Club career
Dicke signed a first professional contract with his hometown club ADO Den Haag in January 2022, a deal keeping him at the club until 2026. He made his Eerste Divisie debut on 6 May 2022 against FC Emmen. 

In August 2022 Dicke joined Estoril on loan. He was assigned to the Under-23 squad in Liga Revelação. In January 2023, Estoril made the transfer permanent and signed a contract with Dicke until 2027.

International career 
Dicke was called up to the Dutch U18 squad in spring 2022.

References

External links

2004 births
Footballers from The Hague
21st-century Dutch people
Living people
Dutch footballers
Netherlands youth international footballers
Association football defenders
ADO Den Haag players
G.D. Estoril Praia players
Eerste Divisie players
Dutch expatriate footballers
Expatriate footballers in Portugal
Dutch expatriate sportspeople in Portugal